Lieutenant John O'Neill VC MM (also spelt O'Niell) (10 February 1897 − 16 October 1942) was a British Army officer and a Scottish recipient of the Victoria Cross (VC), the highest and most prestigious award for gallantry in the face of the enemy that can be awarded to British and Commonwealth forces.

O'Neill was 21 years old, and a sergeant in the 2nd Battalion, Prince of Wales's Leinster Regiment, British Army during the First World War when in October 1918 near Moorsele, Belgium, he won the Victoria Cross.

The citation reads:

O'Neill later served in the RAF as an armourer sergeant where he served alongside T. E. Lawrence

On 1 June 1940 O'Neill was commissioned as a lieutenant in the Auxiliary Military Pioneer Corps. In that year he was an officer on HMT Dunera, taking to Australia "enemy aliens", most of whom were German Jews. Possessions of the internees were rifled through and stolen.  He appeared as a witness at a subsequent court martial. The internees used the Russian song "Stenka Rassin" with new ironic German text:

 

John O'Neill died of a heart attack on 16 October 1942. He is buried at Holy Trinity Church, Hoylake, in The Wirral.

References

Monuments to Courage (David Harvey, 1999)
The Register of the Victoria Cross (This England, 1997)
Scotland's Forgotten Valour (Graham Ross, 1995)
VCs of the First World War - The Final Days 1918 (Gerald Gliddon, 2000)

External links
Location of grave and VC medal (Cheshire)

1897 births
1942 deaths
British World War I recipients of the Victoria Cross
Prince of Wales's Leinster Regiment soldiers
British Army personnel of World War I
People from Airdrie, North Lanarkshire
Royal Pioneer Corps officers
British Army personnel killed in World War II
British Army recipients of the Victoria Cross
Knights of the Order of Leopold II
Recipients of the Médaille militaire (France)
Military personnel from Lanarkshire
Burials in Cheshire